Fizzy Fuzzy Big & Buzzy is an album by the American band the Refreshments, released in 1996. Many of the tracks are re-recordings of songs from their debut, Wheelie, which saw a limited release. The album title is an homage to the Who's Meaty Beaty Big and Bouncy.

The album sold more than 60,000 copies in its first four months of release. Its first single was "Banditos", which was a rock radio hit; the second single was "Down Together". The band supported the album by touring with Seven Mary Three.

Fizzy Fuzzy Big & Buzzy was issued on vinyl in 2015.

Critical reception

The Vancouver Sun wrote: "Starchy, middle-of-the-road, radio-friendly, four-piece pop, Fizzy Fuzzy Big and Buzzy is entirely inoffensive—even fleetingly catchy." The Calgary Herald thought that "while Fizzy Fuzzy Big & Buzzy goes down a little flat in parts, most of it is a sparkling affair of songs whose melodies are delightfully down-home, electric geetar-driven and whose characters play out their feelings and lives in bars and beneath the stars in memorable fashion."

The Chicago Tribune deemed the album "truly mediocre bar band rock."

AllMusic wrote that "all the anguished grunge and post-grunge posing got old fast—and with clever lyrics, solidly melodic guitar work, and Roger Clyne's marketable voice, the Refreshments kept fun alive on the alternative scene throughout the decade's latter half."

Track listing
All songs written by Roger Clyne and Paul "P.H." Naffah, except where noted.
 "Blue Collar Suicide" - 3:35  
 "European Swallow" - 4:32
 "Down Together" - 4:23
 "Mekong" - 4:34
 "Don't Wanna Know" - 4:42
 "Girly" - 3:58
 "Banditos" - 4:17
 "Mexico" (Clyne, Naffah, Edwards) - 4:00
 "Interstate" (Clyne, Naffah, Edwards) - 5:39
 "Suckerpunch" (Clyne, Naffah, Edwards) - 3:39
 "Carefree" (Clyne, Naffah, Edwards) - 3:41
 "Nada" (Clyne, Naffah, Edwards) - 6:27

References

The Refreshments (U.S. band) albums
1996 albums
Mercury Records albums